Igreja de Nossa Senhora da Oliveira  is a collegiate church in Guimarães, Portugal. It is classified as a National Monument.

External links

Churches in Braga District
National monuments in Braga District
Buildings and structures in Guimarães